Parliamentary elections were held in Norway on 17 October 1927. The Labour Party emergeed as the largest party, winning 59 of the 150 seats in the Storting. However, the subsequent government was headed by Ivar Lykke of the Conservative Party.

Results

Seat distribution

See also
1927 Conservative Party national convention

Notes

References

General elections in Norway
1920s elections in Norway
Norway
Parliamentary
Norway